Juventus Football Club won the league title for the first time in nine years. The Scudetto was won in the wake of defender Andrea Fortunato's death from cancer during the course of the season. The title was dedicated to the 23-year-old, who had been established in the starting line-up before he got sick.

This first Serie A success since the 1985–86 season was accompanied by a Coppa Italia win over Parma. The Turin club won both legs, 1–0 at the Stadio delle Alpi and 2–0 at the Stadio Ennio Tardini.

In the UEFA Cup, Juventus again met Parma in the final, having previously beaten Borussia Dortmund. This time, however, Juventus were defeated by Parma (0–1, 1–1), thus denying them a season treble.

Players

Squad information
Squad at end of season

Transfers

Competitions

Serie A

League table

Results by round

Matches

Coppa Italia

Second round

Third round

Quarter-finals

Semi-finals

Final

UEFA Cup

First round

Second round

Third round

Quarter-finals

Semi-finals

Final

Statistics

Players Statistics

Goalscorers

References

Juventus F.C. seasons
Juventus
Italian football championship-winning seasons